Maya Jansen (27 May 1994) is an American tennis player. Together with Canadian player, Erin Routliffe, she won the 2014 and 2015 NCAA women's doubles championship as members of the tennis team of the University of Alabama.  She also won the 2015 US Open National playoffs women's doubles championship, earning her a wild card entry to the US Open women's doubles tournament.

ITF finals (0–1)

Doubles (0–1)

References

American female tennis players
1994 births
Living people
Alabama Crimson Tide women's tennis players